"N.Y., You Got Me Dancing" is a disco song written and produced by Gregg Diamond and performed by the Andrea True Connection. It was released as the first single from her 1977 album, White Witch. The song was a moderate chart success in the US, reaching #27 on the Billboard Hot 100, and #4 on the US club chart. It received a positive review from the Billboard magazine.

Andrea True performed the song on the German TV show Disco.

Track listing
7" single
A. "N.Y., You Got Me Dancing" – 3:40
B. "Keep It Up Longer" – 4:36

Charts

References

External links
 Official audio on YouTube
 Andrea True Connection at Discogs

1977 singles
1977 songs
Andrea True Connection songs
Buddah Records singles
Songs about dancing
Songs about New York City
Songs written by Gregg Diamond